Daniel Reeves Stores was a grocery store chain which numbered 297 units in the New York City area in 1922. The business was founded by the father and uncle of Dan Reeves. The founders worked their way up from fruit peddlers.

Merger

Daniel Reeves Stores merged with Safeway, Inc, in 1941.  The merger was announced by James 
Reeves, president of Daniel Reeves Stores, Inc., and included its eastern chain of 408 grocery stores.

References

External links
 The GG Archives – Article About James Reeves, who with his brother, Daniel Reeves, Built the Daniel Reeves, Inc. Grocery Store Chain (1923)

Defunct companies based in New York City
20th century in New York City
Defunct supermarkets of the United States